Pichhore is a town and a nagar panchayat in Shivpuri district in the Indian state of Madhya Pradesh.It is Also linked with Train route from Basai railway station situated 35 km from Pichhore.

Demographics
 India census, Pichhore had a population of 18,127. Males constitute 53% of the population and females 47%. Pichhore has an average literacy rate of 64%, higher than the national average of 59.5%: male literacy is 70%, and female literacy is 58%. In Pichhore, 14% of the population is under 6 years of age.Coordinates of this town are 25°10'25"N   78°11'18"E.In the census of India-2001 high quality of services rendered by Rakesh Tripathi Shesha ji. On behalf The President of India the census commissioner of India the census, confer upon bronze medal and certificate of honour.Pichhore has been generating talents for many years in different fields like education,politics and many more. The students coming from this small town have done wonders and made their town proud of them.
Dhala crater (N25°17'59.7" and E78°8'3.1") is situated in Shivpuri district, Madhya Pradesh State, India. Currently, the diameter of the structure is estimated at 11 km based on field observations. 
Pichhore Vidhan Sabha constituency (Hindi: पिछोर विधान सभा निर्वाचन क्षेत्र) is one of the 230 Vidhan Sabha (Legislative Assembly) constituencies of Madhya Pradesh state in central India.
Pichhore (constituency number 26) is one of the 5 Vidhan Sabha constituencies located in Shivpuri district. This constituency covers the entire Khaniyadhana tehsil, Pichhore nagar panchayat and part of Pichhore tehsil of the district.
Pichhore is part of Guna Lok Sabha constituency along with seven other Vidhan Sabha segments, namely, Shivpuri and Kolaras in this district, Bamori and Guna in Guna district and Ashok Nagar, Chanderi and Mungaoli in Ashoknagar district.

Members of Legislative Assembly

From Pichhore Shivpuri constituency:
1957: Laxmi Narayan Gupta, Hindu Mahasabha
From Pichhore constituency:
1962: Laxmi Narayan Gupta, Hindu Mahasabha
1967: Laxmi Narayan Gupta, Swatantra Party
1972: Bhanu Pratap Singh, Indian National Congress
1977: Kamal Singh Paderiya, Janata Party
1980: Bhaiya Saheb Lodhi, Indian National Congress (I)
1985: Bhaiya Saheb Lodhi, Indian National Congress
1990: Laxmi Narayan Gupta, Bharatiya Janata Party
1993: K. P. Singh 'Kakka Ju', Indian National Congress
1998: K. P. Singh 'Kakka Ju', Indian National Congress
2003: K. P. Singh 'Kakka Ju', Indian National Congress
2008: K. P. Singh 'Kakka ju', Indian National Congress
2013: K. P. Singh 'Kakka ju', Indian National Congress
2018: K. P. Singh 'Kakka ju', Indian National Congress
The politics is dominating in MP .as far as Education is concerned . the boys of the town are performing well they are in jobs  and excelling in different field

References

Shivpuri